Salvation Joan is a lost 1916 silent film directed by Wilfrid North and starring Edna May. It was produced by the Vitagraph Company of America and released by V-L-S-E(Vitagraph, Lubin, Selig, Essanay). Though an original screen story, it bears a close resemblance to Edward Sheldon's Salvation Nell which was filmed several times.

Cast
Edna May - Joan Crawford
Harry T. Morey - Bill, alias of John Hilton)
Dorothy Kelly - Madeline Ellison
Donald Hall - Robert Ellison
Bobby Connelly - Bobby Ellison
L. Rogers Lytton - Philip Ralston
Eulalie Jensen
Belle Bruce

References

External links

Edna May in costume in the film
website to Edna May and Salvation Joan

1916 films
American silent feature films
American black-and-white films
Lost American films
Films directed by Wilfrid North
Vitagraph Studios films
1910s English-language films
1916 comedy-drama films
1916 lost films
Lost comedy-drama films
1910s American films
Silent American comedy-drama films